The BMW R1100RT is a BMW touring motorcycle with a horizontally-opposed twin-cylinder boxer engine. It was built from 1996 to 2001 in the BMW Berlin plant in Spandau, together with several sister models of similar design, including the R1100R, R1100GS and R1100RS, with almost identical engines but different engine tunes, trim levels and chassis details.

General 
The R1100RT was released in 1996 as a successor to the R100RT. In addition to extensive changes to the full fairing, the engine power was increased significantly from 44 to 66 kW (60 to 90 hp), and the capacity increased from 971 cc to 1085 cc. It has a bore of 99 mm, a stroke of 70.5 mm, and a compression ratio of 10.7:1. Top speed is 211 km/h, and the time to accelerate from 0 to 100 km/h is 3.9 seconds.

The bike comes standard with an anti-lock braking system and a regulated three-way catalytic converter. The chassis is constructed in three parts and consists of front and rear frame and a co-supporting ligands motor-gear unit. The suspension was formed on the front by a Telelever and the rear via a Paralever swingarm.

The fuel tank holds 25.2 litres (6.6 gallons), 6 litres (1.5 gallons) reserve. The average fuel consumption is 3.9 litres per 100 km (~60mpg) at a speed of 86 km/h (~55mph) or 4.7 litres (50mpg) at 120 km/h (75mph). The manufacturer recommends the use of petrol with a knock resistance of at least 95 RON / 91 octane. The front tyres have the dimensions 120/70 ZR 17 and rear 160/60 ZR 18. The bike weighs 285 kg (628lbs) in running order and has a maximum additional payload of 205 kg (452 lb).

In 2001, the R1100RT was superseded by the R1150RT. 

Touring motorcycles with comparable equipment and motor characteristics are the Honda Pan-European, the Honda Gold Wing and the Triumph Trophy 1200.

References 

 

R1100RT
Motorcycles powered by flat engines
Shaft drive motorcycles
Motorcycles introduced in 1996
Sport touring motorcycles
Touring motorcycles